Aspidimorpha is a large Old World genus of beetles belonging to the family Chrysomelidae; there are some 200 species. The genus name is frequently misspelled as "Aspidomorpha", due to an unjustified spelling change in 1848.

Selected species 
 Aspidimorpha adhaerens
 Aspidimorpha amabilis
 Aspidimorpha amplissima
 Aspidimorpha apicalis
 Aspidimorpha areata
 Aspidimorpha aruwimiensis
 Aspidimorpha assimilis
 Aspidimorpha aurata
 Aspidimorpha australasiae
 Aspidimorpha bimaculata
 Aspidimorpha castula
 Aspidimorpha chlorina
 Aspidimorpha chlorotica
 Aspidimorpha cincta
 Aspidimorpha confinis
 Aspidimorpha cordigera
 Aspidimorpha deusta
 Aspidimorpha diaphana
 Aspidimorpha difformis
 Aspidimorpha dilecta
 Aspidimorpha dissentanea
 Aspidimorpha dorsata
 Aspidimorpha douei
 Aspidimorpha dulcicula
 Aspidimorpha elevata
 Aspidimorpha fenestrata
 Aspidimorpha fragilis
 Aspidimorpha furcata
 Aspidimorpha fusconotata
 Aspidimorpha fuscopunctata
 Aspidimorpha gorhami
 Aspidimorpha gruevi
 Aspidimorpha guerini 
 Aspidimorpha honesta
 Aspidimorpha impicta
 Aspidimorpha indica
 Aspidimorpha inquinata
 Aspidimorpha lateralis
 Aspidimorpha madagascarica
 Aspidimorpha miliaris
 Aspidimorpha mutata
 Aspidimorpha mutilata
 Aspidimorpha nigromaculata
 Aspidimorpha novaguineensis
 Aspidimorpha obovata
 Aspidimorpha prasina
 Aspidimorpha puncticosta
 Aspidimorpha punctum 
 Aspidimorpha quadrimaculata
 Aspidimorpha quadriradiata
 Aspidimorpha quadriramosa
 Aspidimorpha quinquefasciata
 Aspidimorpha quinqueguttulata
 Aspidimorpha rainoni
 Aspidimorpha sanctaecrucis
 Aspidimorpha sellata
 Aspidimorpha silacea
 Aspidimorpha socia
 Aspidimorpha strigosa
 Aspidimorpha sumatrana
 Aspidimorpha tecta
 Aspidimorpha togata 
 Aspidimorpha tortuosa
 Aspidimorpha transparipennis
 Aspidimorpha vernicata
 Aspidimorpha westwoodi
(Incomplete list)

Notes

References 
 
 

Cassidinae
Chrysomelidae genera